LocoMania is a puzzle game developed by Czech studio 7FX, published by Lighthouse Interactive. The player plays as the train dispatcher and controls switches and train directions with the intent to get the trains through the system as fast as possible. LocoMania features 12 maps, 26 trains and 36 train carriages.

Gameplay 
The game puts the player in the position of a train dispatcher. Various signals and track switches across the map can be controlled to direct the trains to their respective destinations. There are 12 different maps with varying themes and climates ranging from rocky mountain passes and deserts to country sides and industrial settings. There is also an additional small and simple map for the tutorial of the game.

The game features steam, diesel and electric locomotives, hauling both passengers as well as freight. None of the trains are drivable. The trains move in a slow and relaxed pace (with the exception of one map containing high speed trains). The game features two loco packs, one consisting of rolling stock from the US and the other from the Czech rolling stock. The player can select one of the packs before starting a level.

References

2006 video games
Puzzle video games
Train simulation video games
Video games developed in the Czech Republic
Windows games
Windows-only games
Lighthouse Interactive games
Single-player video games